Theodore William Bruce (28 July 1923 – 1 August 2002) was an Australian athlete who mainly competed in the men's long jump. He represented Australia at the 1948 Summer Olympics in London, where he won the silver medal in his specialty.

Competition in the long jump was particularly keen at the London Games. Willie Steele of the U.S. won the gold medal at 25' 8"; Theo Bruce came in second, taking the silver medal at 24' 9.5". Herb Douglas captured the bronze with a jump of 24' 9", and Lorenzo Wright of the United States ended up fourth at 24' 5.25". Bruce also competed as a member of the Australian 4 × 100 m relay team which did not qualify for the final.

References

External links
  (archive 2)
 
 

1923 births
2002 deaths
Australian male high jumpers
Australian male long jumpers
Olympic silver medalists for Australia
Athletes (track and field) at the 1948 Summer Olympics
Olympic athletes of Australia
Medalists at the 1948 Summer Olympics
Olympic silver medalists in athletics (track and field)
20th-century Australian people